Invasion of the Pod People (released in some countries as Invasion: The Beginning) is a 2007 science-fiction film produced by The Asylum.

Like several other films by The Asylum, Invasion of the Pod People is a mockbuster whose release coincided with the premiere of The Invasion, although the plot of Pod People borrowed heavily from the 1956 film Invasion of the Body Snatchers, of which The Invasion is a reworking.

Plot 
The film is about Melissa (Erica Roby), a young woman living in Los Angeles, who works for a large corporation.

One night, there is a freak meteor shower. The next morning, Melissa goes about her day but as time passes, slowly becomes aware that those around her have changed since the meteorites fell. It's as if their minds are no longer their own. For example, Melissa's supervisor Samantha seduces her into a passionate lesbian encounter, even though Samantha had never shown any signs of being a lesbian.

Melissa soon realizes that the townsfolk have been replaced by a race of aliens known as Pod People. The aliens grow in large seed pods and gradually take the form of a particular person, eventually taking over their bodies once the growth process is complete. The Pod People try to take control of Melissa, but she flees the town to warn humanity of the invasion in progress.

Cast 
 Erica Roby as Melissa
 Jessica Bork as Samantha
 Sarah Lieving as Louise
 Danae Nason as Billie
 Shaley Scott as Taylor
 Michael Tower as Vickland
 David Shick as Andrew
 Amanda Ward as Casey
 Marat Glazer as Det. Pete Alexander
 Lorraine Smith as Bailey
 Leigh Scott as Zach
 Elliot Salter as Pawnbroker
 Justin Jones as James
 Nat Magnuson as Photographer

Reception 
Stefan Birgir Stefansson of sbs.is heavily criticized the film, writing that it "Looks like it was made by a film student who thinks he's the real deal, even though he can't grasp how light or sound really works. An idiotic remake that puts everyone involved to shame and perhaps, a place in hell! And yes, pod-people=lesbians..." Dread Central wrote a mixed review, as they felt it was "okay for what it is; an instantly forgettable retread neither deserving of much praise nor scorn."

See also 
 The Day the Earth Stopped – A similar film produced by The Asylum in 2008
 Invasion of the Body Snatchers – The original 1956 film on which Pod People is based
 The Invasion – A similar film released in the same year
 Strange Invaders – A 1983 film based on the same concept of alien possession
 H. G. Wells' War of the Worlds, another Asylum film that was titled internationally as Invasion

References

External links 
 
 
 

2007 films
2007 independent films
2000s science fiction thriller films
Alien invasions in films
American independent films
American science fiction thriller films
The Asylum films
Body Snatchers films
Direct-to-video science fiction films
2000s English-language films
Direct-to-video thriller films
Films set in Los Angeles
Lesbian-related films
Films directed by Justin Jones
2000s American films